is a Japanese actress, model, and former singer. She is signed to the agency Amuse, Inc. and is a former member of Japanese idol group Sakura Gakuin.

In 2015, Matsui endorsed the Ghana chocolate brand. She also released her first photobook on March 27, which contains swimsuit and lingerie shots from Guam and Fukushima.

Matsui's younger brother, Renji, is a professional footballer, who as of 2022, plays for Kawasaki Frontale.

Filmography

Film

Television

References

External links
 Airi Matsui's official profile at Amuse, Inc. 
 
 Airi's official blog

1996 births
Living people
Japanese idols
Japanese female models
Sakura Gakuin members
Musicians from Fukushima Prefecture
Japanese child actresses
Japanese women pop singers
Amuse Inc. talents
21st-century Japanese actresses